The following is a list of hentai manga physically published in English, covering numerous publications of adult works within the manga genre.

Hentai
Hentai manga artists